St Barnabas' Church is on Watery Lane, Darwen, Lancashire, England.  It is an active Anglican parish church in the deanery of Blackburn with Darwen, the archdeaconry of Blackburn, and the diocese of Blackburn.  Its benefice is united with that of St Mary, Grimehills.

The church was built in 1884 as a mission church, and designed by the Lancaster partnership of Paley and Austin.  It cost £1,462, and provided seating for 360 people.  It is constructed in stone, with a Westmorland slate roof.  On the church is a bellcote with a pyramidal slated roof.  Its windows are square-headed.  The church contains stained glass windows dating from 1963 by Shrigley and Hunt.

See also

List of ecclesiastical works by Paley and Austin

References

Churches completed in 1878
19th-century Church of England church buildings
Diocese of Blackburn
Barnabas, Darwen
Darwen, St Barnabas' Church
Darwen